The Miss Paraguay 2010 pageant was held on July 9, 2010. The pageant was broadcast live on Telefuturo. Yohana Benitez was crowned Miss Universo Paraguay and represented the country at the Miss Universe 2010. Egni Eckert was chosen as Miss Mundo Paraguay and went to the Miss World 2010 pageant while María José Paredes represented Paraguay at the Miss International 2010 pageant after being chosen as Miss Internacional Paraguay.

Results

Delegates
There were 18 official contestants

See also
Miss Paraguay

External links
Promociones Gloria.
MissParaguay.org.
Belleza Paraguaya.

References

2010
2010 beauty pageants
2010 in Paraguay
July 2010 events in South America